Hannah Arnold (c. 1705/06? – August 15, 1758) was the mother of American-born British Brigadier General Benedict Arnold (1741–1801).

Early life and marriages
Hannah Arnold was born in Norwich, Connecticut, to John and Elizabeth Waterman. Her first husband, Absalom King, was a wealthy merchant who had settled in the area. The couple had a daughter, also named Hannah. Not long after, however, King died at sea from the smallpox. Hannah married again, this time to Captain Benedict Arnold, the descendant of Rhode Island governor Benedict Arnold. The Arnolds had six children. As was not unusual at the time, most of the couple's children died young, many within months of one another due to a yellow fever outbreak, including an older son, Benedict. A younger son, also named Benedict, was born in 1741. Shortly thereafter, market downturns caused hardships in the family finances.

Later life and death
Hannah Arnold died on August 15, 1758, and was buried in the Old Uptown Burying Ground, Norwich, Connecticut. Hannah's death fell hard on her widowed husband, Captain Benedict Arnold, who lingered some time and suffered with alcoholism and depression. He died in 1761.

Historical reputation and legacy
Hannah Arnold is remembered in Norwich as a worthy woman and a model of "piety, patience, and virtue." Her gravestone is still visible in Norwichtown Burying Grounds, yet no one knows who paid for it.

References

Further reading
Genealogical and family history of the state of Maine By George Thomas Little, Henry Sweetser Burrage, Albert Roscoe Stubbs

1758 deaths
18th-century American women
Hannah
Burials in Connecticut
Colonial American women
People from Norwich, Connecticut
People of colonial Connecticut
Year of birth uncertain